The men's 100 metre butterfly S8 event at the 2012 Paralympic Games took place on 30 August, at the London Aquatics Centre.

Three heats were held, two with six swimmers each and one with seven swimmers. The swimmers with the eight fastest times advanced to the final.

Heats

Heat 1

Heat 2

Heat 3

Final

References

Swimming at the 2012 Summer Paralympics